El Tejar may refer to:

 El Tejar del Guarco, or Tejar de El Guarco, the capital of the El Guarco canton, in Cartago province, Costa Rica
 El Tejar, Chimaltenango, a municipality in Chimaltenango department, Guatemala
 El Tejar, Chiriquí, Panama

See also
 Tejar (disambiguation)